Knowledge Day, often simply called 1 September, is the day when the school year traditionally starts in Russia and many other former Soviet republics as well as other countries in the former Eastern Bloc (excluding Romania which falls on September 11 and the former East Germany varies in a coordinated fashion and Azerbaijan which falls on September 15) and Israel.

Description

Knowledge Day originated in the USSR, where it had been established by the Decree of the Presidium of the Supreme Soviet of the USSR of 15 June 1984. An important role in the approval of the new holiday date was played by the honored school teacher, director of the Krasnodar school, Bryukhovetsky Fedor Fedorovich. This day also marks the end of summer and the beginning of autumn. It has special significance for the incoming class of first graders who come to school for the first time and often participate in a celebratory assembly on this date. The day also involves the First Bell (Первый Звонок). Students in other grades may begin studies on September 1 or a few days later, usually without any special festivities.

1 September has an iconic cultural status in the Russian-speaking world and is immediately recognized there primarily in connection with the beginning of the school year.

In Israel, Knowledge Day is observed on 1 September. Due to immigration of the former Soviet families to Israel, it is observed as such.

There is also "Last School-Bell Day" (End of the year).

Significant Events

Beslan school siege 

On Knowledge Day (1 September) 2004 the occupants of School Number One in the Russian Town of Beslan were taken hostage by armed Chechen terrorist group Riyadus-Salikhin. The Beslan school siege lasted 3 days and ended catastrophically when Russian security services stormed the building, resulting in the death of 333 hostages, 186 of them children. The mishandling of the siege by the Russian authorities resulted in significant political implications for the Russian state.

References

External links 

The best of Ukraine

See also
Education in Russia
Public holidays in Russia

Education in Russia
Observances in Russia
Public holidays in the Soviet Union
Autumn events in Russia
September observances
Education in Israel